Aloysius Bevilacqua (1618–1679) was a Roman Catholic prelate who served as Titular Patriarch of Alexandria (1675–1680).

Biography
Aloysius Bevilacqua was born in 1618 in Ferrara, Italy.
On 30 Sep 1675, he was appointed during the papacy of Pope Clement X as Titular Patriarch of Alexandria.
On 25 Feb 1676, he was consecrated bishop by Mario Alberizzi, Cardinal-Priest, with Domenico Gianuzzi, Titular Bishop of Dioclea in Phrygia, and Giacomo Buoni, Bishop of Montefeltro, serving as co-consecrators. 
He served as Titular Patriarch of Alexandria until his death on 21 Apr 1679.

As the diplomatic representative of Innocent XI Bevilacqua, assisted by future cardinal Lorenzo Casoni was papal nuncio at the peace Congress of Nijmegen 1678–79, intermediating between the Austrian, Spanish and other Catholic delegations there.

References

External links and additional sources

 (for Chronology of Bishops) 
 (for Chronology of Bishops) 

17th-century Roman Catholic titular bishops
Bishops appointed by Pope Clement X
1618 births
1679 deaths